John Southern (c.1758–1815) was an English engineer, son of Thomas Southern of Derbyshire. He co-invented the indicator diagram with his employer, James Watt, in 1796. Southern became a partner of the firm of Boulton & Watt in 1810. The use of the diagram was kept as a trade secret for a generation, only becoming public in the 1830s.

References

English engineers
18th-century British engineers
People from Derbyshire
1815 deaths
Year of birth unknown
Year of birth uncertain